In mathematics, the discriminant of an algebraic number field is a numerical invariant that, loosely speaking, measures the size of the (ring of integers of the) algebraic number field. More specifically, it is proportional to the squared volume of the fundamental domain of the ring of integers, and it regulates which primes are ramified.

The discriminant is one of the most basic invariants of a number field, and occurs in several important analytic formulas such as the functional equation of the Dedekind zeta function of K, and the analytic class number formula for K. A theorem of Hermite states that there are only finitely many number fields of bounded discriminant, however determining this quantity is still an open problem, and the subject of current research.

The discriminant of K can be referred to as the absolute discriminant of K to distinguish it from the relative discriminant of an extension K/L of number fields. The latter is an ideal in the ring of integers of L, and like the absolute discriminant it indicates which primes are ramified in K/L. It is a generalization of the absolute discriminant allowing for L to be bigger than Q; in fact, when L = Q, the relative discriminant of K/Q is the principal ideal of Z generated by the absolute discriminant of K.

Definition
Let K be an algebraic number field, and let OK be its ring of integers. Let b1, ..., bn be an integral basis of OK (i.e. a basis as a Z-module), and let {σ1, ..., σn} be the set of embeddings of K into the complex numbers (i.e. injective ring homomorphisms K → C). The discriminant of K is the square of the determinant of the n by n matrix B whose (i,j)-entry is σi(bj). Symbolically,

Equivalently, the trace from K to Q can be used. Specifically, define the trace form to be the matrix whose (i,j)-entry is
TrK/Q(bibj). This matrix equals BTB, so the discriminant of K is the determinant of this matrix.

The discriminant of an order in K with integral basis b1, ..., bn is defined in the same way.

Examples
 
An integer that occurs as the discriminant of a quadratic number field is called a fundamental discriminant.
Cyclotomic fields: let n > 2 be an integer, let ζn be a primitive nth root of unity, and let Kn = Q(ζn) be the nth cyclotomic field. The discriminant of Kn is given by
 
 where  is Euler's totient function, and the product in the denominator is over primes p dividing n.
Power bases: In the case where the ring of integers has a power integral basis, that is, can be written as OK = Z[α], the discriminant of K is equal to the discriminant of the minimal polynomial of α. To see this, one can choose the integral basis of OK to be b1 = 1, b2 = α, b3 = α2, ..., bn = αn−1. Then, the matrix in the definition is the Vandermonde matrix associated to αi = σi(α), whose determinant squared is
 
which is exactly the definition of the discriminant of the minimal polynomial.
Let K = Q(α) be the number field obtained by adjoining a root α of the polynomial x3 − x2 − 2x − 8. This is Richard Dedekind's original example of a number field whose ring of integers does not possess a power basis. An integral basis is given by {1, α, α(α + 1)/2} and the discriminant of K is −503.
Repeated discriminants: the discriminant of a quadratic field uniquely identifies it, but this is not true, in general, for higher-degree number fields. For example, there are two non-isomorphic cubic fields of discriminant 3969.

Basic results
Brill's theorem: The sign of the discriminant is (−1)r2 where r2 is the number of complex places of K.
A prime p ramifies in K if and only if p divides ΔK .
Stickelberger's theorem:
 
Minkowski's bound: Let n denote the degree of the extension K/Q and r2 the number of complex places of K, then
 

Minkowski's theorem: If K is not Q, then |ΔK| > 1 (this follows directly from the Minkowski bound).
Hermite–Minkowski theorem: Let N be a positive integer. There are only finitely many (up to isomorphisms) algebraic number fields K with |ΔK| < N.  Again, this follows from the Minkowski bound together with Hermite's theorem (that there are only finitely many algebraic number fields with prescribed discriminant).

History

The definition of the discriminant of a general algebraic number field, K, was given by Dedekind in 1871. At this point, he already knew the relationship between the discriminant and ramification.

Hermite's theorem predates the general definition of the discriminant with Charles Hermite publishing a proof of it in 1857. In 1877, Alexander von Brill determined the sign of the discriminant. Leopold Kronecker first stated Minkowski's theorem in 1882, though the first proof was given by Hermann Minkowski in 1891. In the same year, Minkowski published his bound on the discriminant. Near the end of the nineteenth century, Ludwig Stickelberger obtained his theorem on the residue of the discriminant modulo four.

Relative discriminant
The discriminant defined above is sometimes referred to as the absolute discriminant of K to distinguish it from the relative discriminant ΔK/L of an extension of number fields K/L, which is an ideal in OL. The relative discriminant is defined in a fashion similar to the absolute discriminant, but must take into account that ideals in OL may not be principal and that there may not be an OL basis of OK. Let {σ1, ..., σn} be the set of embeddings of K into C which are the identity on L. If b1, ..., bn is any basis of K over L, let d(b1, ..., bn) be the square of the determinant of the n by n matrix whose (i,j)-entry is σi(bj). Then, the relative discriminant of K/L is the ideal generated by the d(b1, ..., bn) as {b1, ..., bn} varies over all integral bases of K/L. (i.e. bases with the property that bi ∈ OK for all i.) Alternatively, the relative discriminant of K/L is the norm of the different of K/L. When L = Q, the relative discriminant ΔK/Q is the principal ideal of Z generated by the absolute discriminant ΔK . In a tower of fields K/L/F the relative discriminants are related by

where  denotes relative norm.

Ramification
The relative discriminant regulates the ramification data of the field extension K/L. A prime ideal p of L ramifies in K if, and only if, it divides the relative discriminant ΔK/L. An extension is unramified if, and only if, the discriminant is the unit ideal. The Minkowski bound above shows that there are no non-trivial unramified extensions of Q. Fields larger than Q may have unramified extensions: for example, for any field with class number greater than one, its Hilbert class field is a non-trivial unramified extension.

Root discriminant
The root discriminant of a degree n number field K is defined by the formula

The relation between relative discriminants in a tower of fields shows that the root discriminant does not change in an unramified extension.

Asymptotic lower bounds
Given nonnegative rational numbers ρ and σ, not both 0, and a positive integer n such that the pair (r,2s) = (ρn,σn) is in Z × 2Z, let αn(ρ, σ) be the infimum of rdK as K ranges over degree n number fields with r real embeddings and 2s complex embeddings, and let α(ρ, σ) =  liminfn→∞ αn(ρ, σ).  Then

,

and the generalized Riemann hypothesis implies the stronger bound

There is also a lower bound that holds in all degrees, not just asymptotically: For totally real fields, the root discriminant is > 14, with 1229 exceptions.

Asymptotic upper bounds
On the other hand, the existence of an infinite class field tower can give upper bounds on the values of α(ρ, σ).  For example, the infinite class field tower over Q() with m = 3·5·7·11·19 produces fields of arbitrarily large degree with root discriminant 2 ≈ 296.276, so α(0,1) < 296.276.  Using tamely ramified towers, Hajir and Maire have shown that α(1,0) < 954.3 and α(0,1) < 82.2, improving upon earlier bounds of Martinet.

Relation to other quantities
Due to its appearance in this volume, the discriminant also appears in the functional equation of the Dedekind zeta function of K, and hence in the analytic class number formula, and the Brauer–Siegel theorem.
The relative discriminant of K/L is the Artin conductor of the regular representation of the Galois group of K/L. This provides a relation to the Artin conductors of the characters of the Galois group of K/L, called the conductor-discriminant formula.

Notes

References

Primary sources

Secondary sources

Further reading
 

Algebraic number theory